Epepeotes taeniotinus is a species of beetle in the family Cerambycidae. It was described by Heller in 1924. It is known from the Philippines and Moluccas.

Subspecies
 Epepeotes taeniotinus gebehensis Breuning, 1974
 Epepeotes taeniotinus taeniotinus (Heller, 1924)

References

taeniotinus
Beetles described in 1924